Scott Cardelle Bone (February 15, 1860January 26, 1936) was the fourth Territorial Governor of Alaska, serving from 1921 to 1925. A Republican, he was appointed by President Warren G. Harding. He is perhaps best known for making the decision to use dog sleds to transport diphtheria antitoxin 674 miles rather than use a plane in the now-famous 1925 Serum Run, (also known as the "Great Race of Mercy") from which the Iditarod Trail Sled Dog Race stems.

Bone was born in Shelby County, Indiana.  He led a very productive life, belonged to numerous organizations and held almost as many positions, such as: chairman of the Alaska Bureau of the Seattle Chamber of Commerce, delegate-at-large to the Republican National Convention, member (and at one time president of) the Gridiron Club, member of the National Press Association, director of publicity for the Republican National Committee, life member of the Red Cross, the Yacht and Country Club of Tampa, Florida, and the Decorated Order of Sacred Treasure of Japan, and a member of the Elks.

He was the editor of The Washington Post, founded The Washington Herald and later was the editor of the Seattle Post-Intelligencer.  He was a friend of Pres. Warren G. Harding, Pres. William Howard Taft, Pres. Theodore Roosevelt, and Alice Roosevelt.

He hosted President Harding and his entourage while they visited Alaska in July 1923.

Books
 Alaska, Its Past, Present, and Future
 Chechahco and Sourdough: A Story of Alaska
 Sketches of Statesmen
 Political Remembrances

Further reading
 The Cruelest Miles: The Heroic Story of Dogs and Men in a Race Against an Epidemic Gay & Laney Salisbury

See also
 1925 serum run to Nome

References

External links
 The Political Graveyard

1860 births
1936 deaths
Alaska Republicans
American Disciples of Christ
Editors of Washington, D.C., newspapers
Governors of Alaska Territory
20th-century American politicians
People from Shelby County, Indiana
Writers from Alaska
Writers from Indiana
Burials at Santa Barbara Cemetery